Eugnosta polymacula is a species of moth of the family Tortricidae. It is found in Brazil (Rio de Janeiro).

The wingspan is about 24 mm. The ground colour of the forewings is creamy, tinged with light brownish sprinkled with pink, especially in the distal half of the wing. The hindwings are brownish creamy, but browner terminally.

References

Moths described in 2002
Eugnosta